Niwa ni wa Niwa Niwatori ga ita, a one-shot manga by Tatsuki Fujimoto
 Niwatori Otoko to Akaikubi, a segment of the Anime anthology Robot Carnival
 Niwatori:_13_Japanese_Birds_Pt._10, an album by Merzbow